D3 or Leningradsko-Kazansky Diameter is the third line of the Moscow Central Diameters which will open in 2023. 13 stations of DC-3 will be interchange stations to the Мetro and the Moscow Central Circle.

Stations

References 

 
Moscow Railway
Railway lines in Russia